Lenka Čurmová (born 8 April 1997) is a Slovak ice hockey defender and member of the Slovak national team, currently playing in the Premier Hockey Federation (PHF) with the Metropolitan Riveters. She and national team teammate Iveta Klimášová were the first Slovak players to play in the PHF.

Playing career   
Čurmová began her career at age twelve, debuting with ŽHK Šarišanka Prešov in the 2009–10 season of the 1.liga žien, Slovakia’s top-tier women’s league. She played with Šarišanka for six seasons, before transferring to HC ŠKP Bratislava of the Elite Women's Hockey League (EWHL). She remained with ŠKP Bratislava until her relocation to North America in 2019 in order to play with the Buffalo Beauts of the National Women's Hockey League (NWHL; renamed PHF in 2021).

The Beauts‘ first game of the 2019–20 season, 5 October 2019 against the Connecticut Whale, was history making; Čurmová became the first Slovak player to ever score a goal in NWHL history when she netted the Beauts‘ opening goal, assisted by MJ Pelletier and Corinne Buie. Later that week, she was the first Slovak player to be named NWHL Player of the Week. She was selected by Team Packer for the 2020 NWHL All-Star Game. In May 2020, she re-signed with the team for the 2020–21 season.

International play 
Čurmová first played with the Slovak national under-18 team at the qualification tournament and final tournament of the 2013 IIHF World Women's U18 Championship – Division I. She went on to play with the team at the 2014 World Women's U18 Championship DI, where she was the highest scoring defenceman, and at the 2014 World Women's U18 Championship DI, where she was the Best Defenceman of the tournament as selected by the directorate.   

Čurmová made her first appearance with the senior Slovak national team at age fifteen, playing all five games of the 2013 IIHF Women's World Championship Division I. She has continued to appear internationally with the senior team, including in the qualification tournaments for the 2018 Winter Olympics and 2022 Winter Olympics, and served as team captain during the 2018–19 season.

Career statistics

Regular season and playoffs

International

References

External links 

 
1997 births
Living people
People from Michalovce
Sportspeople from the Košice Region
Slovak women's ice hockey defencemen

Buffalo Beauts players
HPK Kiekkonaiset players

Slovak expatriate ice hockey players in Finland
Slovak expatriate ice hockey players in the United States
European Women's Hockey League players
Slovak expatriate ice hockey players in Sweden